Hapsi sve! is the first live album by Bosnian rock band Zabranjeno Pušenje, released in 1998. It was released through Croatia Records in Croatia and A Records in Yugoslavia.

Recording 
The songs are recorded over two nights at Dom Sportova, in Zagreb on July 10, 1997, and at the Metalac school yard in Sarajevo on September 25, 1997.

Track listing
Source: Discogs

Personnel 
Credits adapted from the album's liner notes.

Zabranjeno Pušenje
 Marin Gradac Mako – trombone, vocals, backing vocals 
 Sejo Sexon – lead vocals, guitar, backing vocals
 Elvis J. Kurtovich – vocals, reciting
 Predrag Bobić Bleka – bass, backing vocals
 Zoran Stojanović – electric guitar 
 Nedžad Podžić Počko – keyboards, backing vocals
 Branko Trajkov Trak – drums
 Bruno Urlić Prco – violin, backing vocals (Vlahov String Quartet)

Additional musicians
 Žana Marendić – vocals (track 9)
 Drago Lokas – harmonica
 Marijan Jakić – saxophone
 Ljubica Kelćec – vocals (Grlice Vocal Duo)
 Kristina Biluš – vocals (Grlice Vocal Duo)
 Robert Boldižar – violin (Vlahov String Quartet)
 Nina Sučić – viola (Vlahov String Quartet)
 Josip Petrač – cello (Vlahov String Quartet)
 Mihovil Karuza – cello (Vlahov String Quartet)

Production
 Sejo Sexon – production
 Zlaja Hadžić Jeff – production, mastering (Rent-A-Cow Studio in Amsterdam, the Netherlands)
 Alan Ward – mastering (Electric City in Brussels, Belgium)
 Amir Bahtijarević – executive production
 Denis Mujadžić Denyken – recording
 Đani Pervan – recording

Backstage crew
 Dario Vitez – stage manager 
 Nosači Zvuka – road crew
 Nebojša Stamenković – lighting, sound system
 Željko Radočaj – lighting, sound system

Design
Dario Vitez – design
Sejo Sexon – design
Ivica Propadalo – design
Haris Memija – photos

References

1998 live albums
Zabranjeno Pušenje albums